Daedong College is a private technical college in Busan, the second-largest city in South Korea.  Its campus lies in the district of Geumjeong-gu.  About 50 instructors are employed. The current president is Kim Gyeong-hui (김경희).

Academics

The college's academic offerings are divided among four departments:  Nursing, Cosmetology, Child Welfare, and Leisure Tourism Management.

History

The college opened in 1971 as Daedong Nursing School (대동간호학교).  It became a junior college (대동간호전문대학) in 1979, and a full college in 1998.  Academic offerings were first broadened beyond nursing in 1996, with the establishment of the Department of Cosmetology.

Sister schools
International ties exist with University of Santo Tomas in the Philippines, and with Shanghai Normal University in China.

See also
Education in South Korea
List of colleges and universities in South Korea

External links
Official school website.

 

Vocational education in South Korea
Universities and colleges in Busan
1971 establishments in South Korea
Educational institutions established in 1971